Bijon Dey (born 30 December 1994) is an Indian cricketer. He made his first-class debut for Meghalaya in the 2018–19 Ranji Trophy on 20 December 2018. He made his Twenty20 debut on 9 November 2019, for Meghalaya in the 2019–20 Syed Mushtaq Ali Trophy.

References

External links
 

1994 births
Living people
Indian cricketers
Meghalaya cricketers
Place of birth missing (living people)